António da Silva Monteiro, 1st Count of Silva Monteiro (August 16, 1822 – January 15, 1885) was a Portuguese nobleman.

Life 
Monteiro was born in 1822 to entrepreneur parents. As a young man, he emigrated to Rio de Janeiro. It was here that he would later become a prominent businessman and the owner of major trading house, which was still thriving at the time of his death.

He received the title of Count of Silva Monteiro on December 22, 1875, by decree of King Luis I of Portugal.
 
He was a Knight of the Royal House and Commander of the Order of the Immaculate Conception of Vila Viçosa.
 
He died of hepatitis on January 15, 1885. His death was mourned not only by the Portuguese royal family but also by many people of different social classes.

Sources 
 Manuel M. Rodrigues - O Occidente: Revista Illustrada de Portugal e do Extrangeiro - 1 February 1885 - Volume VIII - n° 220 - page: 25/26.

1822 births
1885 deaths
Portuguese nobility
People from Porto
19th-century Portuguese people